Futbol Club Barcelona is a professional futsal club based in Barcelona, Catalonia, Spain. It is a part of the FC Barcelona sports club.

Originally FC Barcelona begun to play futsal in 1978, until it was disbanded in 1982. Later, in 1986, the club was re-founded and now plays local matches in the Palau Blaugrana, which has a capacity of 7,585 seats. It is one of the most successful futsal clubs in Spain as well as in Europe.

History

First stage of the club 

The FC Barcelona started playing futsal in 1976, although it was not officially established until September 1978. At that time it was formed by former Barca players gathered to play friendly tournaments and charity matches. Finally, the implementation of futsal in Catalonia led the bank president Josep Lluís Núñez to officially establish a team.

The first stage of FC Barcelona futsal was playing in regional tournaments in Catalonia, where they made a good progression and won the regional title in 1980. Although the club became champions in the first two seasons in that division, the Board agreed to dissolve the club in 1982/83.

Admission to LNFS 

The club did not regain official futsal status until 1986, when they began to take part in tournaments at the national level. FC Barcelona was one of the leaders in the sport at the end of the decade, since in the season 1987/88 reached the final of the Copa de España (FEFS) and in 1988/89 was proclaimed winner of the tournament. In 1990 the Catalan club won the European Cup over Italian champions AS Roma Futsal. Though at the time it was an unofficial tournament.

With the union of competitions Spanish Federation and the Football Association Board, FC Barcelona was one of the first participants in the Liga National Futbol Sala, consisting of 48 teams. Barca passed the first stage of the tournament in second place, but in the second phase finished in last place, so they could not qualify for the playoffs for the title.

The Catalan fleet remained one of the leading clubs in the LNFS until the introduction of the regular season in 1995/96. FC Barcelona reduced the budget section of futsal and the team had to be formed from only homegrown players. Finally, Barça went down to the Second Division in 1997/98.

Difficult Years 

Although FC Barcelona set the target to be back in the Division Honor the team finished sixth in their first season in the second division. Finally, Barca was promoted in the 1999/2000 season, finishing second in the regular season and won the playoff for promotion.

However, their return to the Division of Honor was worse than expected. For three seasons the Catalans were at the bottom of the table struggling not to be relegated when in 2002/03 the club finished in 15th place in the standings and were relegated for a second time to the Second Division.

On this occasion, it took FC Barcelona three seasons in the second division before they returned to the top flight. Despite finishing in the top two positions in their three-year spell in the second division Barca fell in the playoffs for promotion. It was not until 2005/06 when, under the coaching of Marc Carmona, that the club was promoted to the first division after defeating Barcelona Gáldar FS in the playoffs.

Professionalization of the club 

After climbing back to the Division of Honor, the president of the club, Joan Laporta, increased the investment in the futsal part of the club. Marc Carmona remained as coach and the club hired international players like Javi Rodriguez, star of Playas de Castellón FS. Although the first season Barca struggled to ensure the permanence, in the year 2007/08 the team finished sixth in the regular season, qualifying for the playoffs for the first time in 11 years.

The football team took their professionalism and, like other sports sections of Barca, had its own sponsor: Senseit (2007), Mobicat (2008) and Alusport (2010). In 2008/09 Barca finish third in the league, but fell in the quarterfinals of the playoffs. In the following year Barca got back into the fight for the title and reached the final, where they lost to eventual champions El Pozo Murcia. In the 2010/11 season, FC Barcelona made history by winning his first official title in futsal, the Copa de España in the final by beating defending champions El Pozo Murcia and also were crowned champions of the first edition of the Copa del Rey, defeating Inter Movistar. Then on 26 June 2011 they completed the season with a historic treble to become champion of the LNFS.

With their first league title FC Barcelona was eligible to play in the UEFA Futsal Cup for the first time in the 2011/2012 season. They entered in the Main round and progressed through the Elite round and into the Final Four. In the Final Four they played Sporting CP in the semis and won comfortably 5-1. With that win they progressed to the final and played against MFK Dinamo Moskva and defeated them 3-1. FC Barcelona's first foray into European competition in 21 years ended with lifting the UEFA Futsal Cup. Since that initial tournament Barca have been a mainstay in the competition by making it into the Final Four each season since and winning another trophy in 2013/2014.

On September 10, 2013 Barca won the Supercopa of Spain, the only title of all the national tournaments that had eluded them. With the Super Cup win, the football club has won all the competitions they have played in.

On May 24, 2016 after 12 years the club announced that Marc Carmona would not continue as the team's coach. Therefore, it ended a brilliant stage of the section under his direction in which the team won 19 titles: 2 Champions (2010, 2014), 3 Leagues (2010–11, 2011–2012, 2012–2013), 3 Spanish Cups (2011, 2012, 2013), 4 King's Cups (2011, 2012, 2013, 2014), 1 Spanish Super Cup (2013) and 6 Catalonia Cups (2008, 2009, 2010, 2013, 2014, 2015). Then, Andreu Plaza was appointed the team's new coach.

At the end of the season 2020-2021, Barça won the domestic futsal League title. This was Barça’s fifth domestic futsal league title, and the 12th trophy in total of the Plaza-Lahoz era, which has included one Champions League. The club reported that Andreu Plaza was no longer the team's coach.

Jesús Velasco was appointed the new FC Barcelona futsal coach, and signed a contract until 2023 with Sergi Altisent named as his assistant. The futsal team win 4 trophies (Super Cup, Spanish Cup, Champions League and Spanish League) in Velasco's first season (2021-22) for the second time in their history after doing so under coach Marc Carmona in 2012.

Honours

National competitions 

Primera División: 6
2010–11, 2011–12, 2012–13, 2018–19, 2020–21, 2021–22
Copa del Rey: 7
2010–11, 2011–12, 2012–13, 2013–14, 2017–18, 2018–19, 2019–20
Supercopa de España: 4 
2013, 2019, 2022, 2023
Copa de España (LNFS): 6
2011, 2012, 2013, 2019, 2020, 2022

European competitions 

UEFA Futsal Champions League: 4
2011–12, 2013–14, 2019–20, 2021–22

Regional competitions 

Catalonia Cup: 11
1999-00, 2008-09, 2009-10, 2010-11, 2013-14, 2014-15, 2015-16, 2016-17, 2017-18, 2018-19, 2022-23

Current squad

Season to season 

28 seasons in Primera División
5 seasons in Segunda División

European competitions record 
Appearances: 10

Summary

Barça Atlètic 

Founded in 1989 as FC Barcelona Futsal B, Barça Atlètic is the futsal reserve team of FC Barcelona Futsal, and currently plays in Segunda División de Futsal.

Reserve teams in Spain play in the same league system as the senior team, rather than in a reserve team league. They must play at least one level below their main side, and thus Barça Atlètic are ineligible for promotion to Primera División. They also cannot play in the Copa del Rey. Nonetheless, all players from the Barça Atlètic squad are eligible to play with the main team on any competition.

Current squad

References

External links 
Official website 
Profile at LNFS.es

 
Catalan futsal clubs
Futsal
Futsal clubs established in 1986
1986 establishments in Spain